Yusuf Emre Gültekin (born 12 March 1993) is a Turkish professional footballer who plays for Samsunspor.

References

External links

1993 births
People from Altındağ, Ankara
Living people
Turkish footballers
Turkey youth international footballers
Association football forwards
Gençlerbirliği S.K. footballers
Hacettepe S.K. footballers
Boluspor footballers
Büyükşehir Belediye Erzurumspor footballers
Ümraniyespor footballers
Samsunspor footballers
Süper Lig players
TFF First League players
TFF Second League players
TFF Third League players